The 2010 Missouri Tigers football team represented the University of Missouri in the 2010 NCAA Division I FBS football season. The team was coached by Gary Pinkel, who returned for his tenth season with Mizzou, and played their home games at Faurot Field at Memorial Stadium.  The team began the season fresh off their fifth straight bowl appearance. The team hired a new public address announcer, Randy Moehlman.

Michael Egnew (TE), was named to the 1st-Team All-American list. He became the third MU tight end to win that honor in the last four years. The previous two were Martin Rucker (2007) and Chase Coffman (2008). Egnew led all of the nation's tight ends with 83 receptions, and his 698 receiving yards was also second-most among all tight ends, with those figures coming against the nation's 9th-toughest schedule. The Tigers finished the regular season with a 10–2 record and faced the Iowa Hawkeyes in the Insight Bowl, which they lost by a score of 27–24.

In early August 2010, the team voted their star running back Derrick Washington team captain.  Washington had led the team in all rushing categories in each of the previous two seasons.  However, just after being named captain, Washington was investigated for sexually assaulting his tutor, a female MU student, which led to a felony charge of deviate sexual assault and his suspension from the football team at the end of preseason camp. He dropped out of school shortly afterwards, and was eventually convicted of sexual assault a year later, serving 120 days of a 5-year sentence.

Recruits
Key Losses:

WR Danario Alexander
DL Jaron Baston
DE Brian Coulter
P  Jake Harry
DL Andy Maples
K  Tanner Mills
WR Jared Perry
S  Hardy Ricks
LB Terrance Jackson
OL Ryan Schleusner
LB Sean Weatherspoon

All 23 listed players are verbal commits and are not binding until signing their National Letter of Intent during the National Signing Period February 3, 2010 – April 1, 2010. 
All 23 signed on February 3.

Schedule

The October 23 game against Oklahoma played host to ESPN's College GameDay, a first for the program, and drew a new record crowd of 18,000 for the show.

Roster

Coaching staff

Coaching staff from:

Game summaries

Illinois
@ St. Louis, Missouri

Blaine Gabbert's second-half TDs rally Mizzou as defense stops Illinois

McNeese State

Powered by freshman RB Henry Josey, Missouri rolls to easy victory

San Diego State

T.J. Moe's touchdown reception with 51 seconds left helps Tigers escape

Miami (OH)

Seven players score TDs as unbeaten Mizzou trounces Miami (Ohio)

Colorado

#24 Missouri fights off sluggish O, Blaine Gabbert injury to best Colorado

@ Texas A&M

Missouri's defense stifles A&M as Blaine Gabbert tosses 3 TDs

Oklahoma 

No. 11 Missouri rides 16-point fourth past top-ranked Oklahoma

QB Blaine Gabbert won Big 12 honors, sharing co-offensive player-of-the-week. Gahn McGaffie was named the special teams player-of-the-week.

Gabbert finished 30 of 42 for 308 yards and a score. In the fourth quarter, he completed 8-of-9 passes for 95 yards and one touchdown.

McGaffie returned the opening kickoff 86 yards for a touchdown. It was the first kickoff return for a touchdown for Mizzou since Jeremy Maclin did it in 2008, and was the first time Mizzou returned the opening kickoff for a touchdown since Roger Wehrli went 96 yards for a score against Iowa State in 1967.

It was the first time Gabbert was named player-of-the-week this season.

This was the first time Missouri started 7–0 since 1960.

@ Nebraska

Roy Helu Jr. rushes for a school-record 307 yards; Nebraska QB Taylor Martinez hobbled

@ Texas Tech

Blaine Gabbert struggles as No. 12 Missouri comes up short

Kansas State 

Blaine Gabbert's 3 TDs, defensive plays give Mizzou edge over error-prone K-State

@ Iowa State

#15 Mizzou uses fake punt to outlast Iowa State

Kansas
@ Kansas City, Missouri

Tigers hold Jayhawks to 141 yards of total offense in win

Gary Pinkel's 150th career win as a coach (77-48 at Missouri, 73-37-3 at Toledo).

Missouri had never played better defensively in a Big 12 game—and now the Tigers might never play another Big 12 game.

In a 35–7 victory over Kansas on Saturday, the Tigers (No. 14 BCS, No. 15 AP) held their archrivals to 141 yards, the fewest they allowed a conference opponent in the Big 12's 15 seasons.

In the 119th meeting between these programs, Missouri evened the all-time series (according to the NCAA record book) at 55-55-9. The Tigers won four of the last five. Missouri wrapped up a 10-win season for the fourth time in school history and third under coach Gary Pinkel.

Iowa (Insight Bowl)
@ Tempe, Arizona

Marcus Coker runs for 219, Micah Hyde returns INT to fuel Iowa rally

Statistics

Statistics from:

Scores by quarter
(through December 28, 2010)

Rankings

References

Missouri
Missouri Tigers football seasons
Missouri Tigers football